Coldwater River may refer to:

In Canada 
 Coldwater River (British Columbia)
Coldwater River (Algoma District), which flows to Lake Superior
 Coldwater River (Simcoe County), which flows to Lake Huron

In the United States 
 Coldwater River (Branch County), Michigan
 Coldwater River (Isabella County), Michigan
 Coldwater River (Western Michigan)
 Coldwater River (Mississippi)
 Cold Water River, alternate name for Blackwater River, Florida

See also
 Coldwater River National Wildlife Refuge, Mississippi
 Coldwater Creek (disambiguation)
 Cold River (disambiguation)